Kaloyan Karadzhinov (born 25 January 1977) is a Bulgarian footballer who plays as a midfielder.

Career

Early career
Karadzhinov started his career in the youth system of Lokomotiv Sofia. In 1996, he was released by Lokomotiv after failing to progress into their first team and joined amateur side Nadezhda Dobroslavtsi. In the following years Karadzhinov has played for a number of amateurs clubs at third and fourth division. In this period, along with his football career, he also worked as a builder, concrete maker, petrol pump attendant and travelling salesman. In 2001, he joined Benkovski Kostinbrod. For three seasons Karadzhinov earned 84 appearances in the Bulgarian V AFG, scored 51 goals. 

Karadzhinov's performances at Benkovski had attracted interest from a number of professional clubs in Bulgaria and in June 2004, at the age of 27, he signed his first professional contract with Minyor Bobov Dol. On 8 August 2004, he made his B Group debut in a 1–0 home win over Chernomorets Burgas. Karadzhinov scored his first league goal for Minyor, as he netted twice in a 3–1 win over Pomorie on 22 August. Because of his good displays he caught eye of Lokomotiv Sofia scouts.

Lokomotiv Sofia
In January 2005 Karadzhinov returned to his first club Lokomotiv Sofia on a two-and-a-half-year contract for an undisclosed fee believed to be around €10 000. He marked his Lokomotiv and A Group début with winning goal in a 2–1 victory over Litex Lovech on 26 February 2005. 

On 13 July 2006, Karadzhinov scored his first-ever UEFA Cup goal in a 2–0 home win over Makedonija Gjorče Petrov. He also scored twice in a 4–0 home win over Bnei Yehuda Tel Aviv on 24 August.

On 14 September 2007, Karadzhinov scored his first hat-trick in the professional football, scoring four in a 4–0 win over Chernomorets Burgas.

Dalian
On 31 January 2008 Karadzhinov joined Chinese side Dalian Shide. The transfer fee was undisclosed, but has been purported to be in the region of €200,000. He earned 7 appearances in the Chinese Super League, before returned to Bulgaria in the summer of 2008. 

On 29 August he joined Botev Plovdiv on a four months loan deal. Karadzhinov made his Botev debut in a 1–1 home draw against Litex Lovech on 13 September. On 27 September he assisted Georgi Avramov for Botev's third goal in a 5–0 home win over Belasitsa Petrich.

Return to Lokomotiv
In January 2009 Karadzhinov was released by Dalian Shide and returned to Lokomotiv Sofia. On 10 May 2009 he scored Lokomotiv's third goal in a 4–2 away victory over Belasitsa Petrich. In October 2011 he left Loko Sofia after being deemed surplus to the requirements. He retired in 2011, but returned in play in 2015, when the team was in the amateur division.

Tornado Bezden accident
In March 2021, while playing for the amateur Tornado Bezden, Karadzhinov was involved in an accident in the league match against Kostinbrod. The match in the fourth tier of Bulgarian football was abandoned after the referee was chased from the pitch by players and officials led by Karadzhinov. Because of the accident he was banned from playing football for 2 years with the referee suing him for inflicted bodily injuries.

International career
On 12 November 2005, Karadzhinov earned his first cap for his country after coming on as a second-half substitute for Blagoy Georgiev in the 6–2 win over Georgia.

International goal
Scores and results list Bulgaria's goal tally first.

Coaching career
In July 2019, Karadzhinov became part of the coaching staff of third division club Nadezhda Dobroslavtsi.

Professional career statistics
As of 12 June 2011

References

External links

1977 births
Living people
Bulgarian footballers
Bulgaria international footballers
Bulgarian expatriate footballers
First Professional Football League (Bulgaria) players
Chinese Super League players
FC Lokomotiv 1929 Sofia players
Dalian Shide F.C. players
Botev Plovdiv players
Expatriate footballers in China
Association football midfielders